Michael Köllner (born 29 December 1969) is a German professional football manager and manager.

Career
Köllner coached 1. FC Nürnberg II before being promoted to first team manager in May 2017. He was sacked on 12 February 2019. He signed for 1860 Munich on 9 November 2019. He was sacked in January 2023.

Managerial record

References

External links

Nürnberg profile
Kicker profile

1969 births
Living people
German football managers
Bundesliga managers
2. Bundesliga managers
1. FC Nürnberg managers
TSV 1860 Munich managers
3. Liga managers